Stade Frédéric-Kibassa-Maliba, also known as Stade de la Kenya, is a multi-use stadium located in the Kenya suburb of Lubumbashi, Democratic Republic of the Congo.  It is currently used mostly for football matches. It is the current home of FC Saint Eloi Lupopo and the former home venue of TP Mazembe.  The stadium has a capacity of 20,000 people and is named after Frederic Kibassa Maliba, a former Minister of Youth and Sports.

References

External links
Stadium picture

Football venues in the Democratic Republic of the Congo
Sport in Lubumbashi
Buildings and structures in Lubumbashi
TP Mazembe